David Morrison (born 26 June 1940) is an American astronomer, a senior scientist at the Solar System Exploration Research Virtual Institute, at NASA Ames Research Center in Mountain View, California.  Morrison is the former director of the Carl Sagan Center for Study of Life in the Universe at the SETI Institute and of the NASA Lunar Science Institute. He is the past Director of Space at NASA Ames.  Morrison is credited as a founder of the multi-disciplinary field of astrobiology. Morrison is best known for his work in risk assessment of near Earth objects such as asteroids and comets.  Asteroid 2410 Morrison was named in his honor. Morrison is also known for his "Ask an Astrobiologist" series on NASA's website where he provides answers to questions submitted by the public. He has published 12 books and over 150 papers primarily on planetary science, astrobiology and near Earth objects.

Biography 

David Morrison was born in Danville, Illinois on June 26, 1940. He attended elementary and high school in Danville and graduated from the University of Illinois Urbana-Champaign in 1962 with high distinction in physics. He studied astronomy at Harvard University and received his Ph.D in 1969, with Carl Sagan as his thesis advisor.

Astronomical career 

Morrison was Professor of Astronomy at Institute for Astronomy at the University of Hawaii-Manoa from 1969 until 1988. He also directed the 3-meter NASA Infrared Telescope Facility of Mauna Kea Observatory and served for two years as University Vice Chancellor for Research. His research accomplishments include demonstration of the uniform high surface temperature of Venus, the discovery that Neptune has a large internal heat source while its “twin” planet Uranus does not, determination of the surface composition of Pluto, first ground-based measurements of the heat flow from Jupiter’s volcanic moon Io, discovery of the fundamental division of the asteroids into dark (primitive) and light (stony) classes, and the first quantitative estimate of the cosmic impact hazard. Morrison was also co-chair of the first NASAAstrobiology Roadmap workshop and report.

He served as a science investigator on Mariner, Voyager and Galileo space science missions. He was on the faculty of the Institute for Astronomy at the University of Hawaii-Manoa from 1969 until 1988, when he joined the senior management staff of NASA Ames Research Center in Mountain View, CA. While on the faculty of the University of Hawaii, Morrison spent two sabbaticals at the Lunar and Planetary Laboratory of the University of Arizona in Tucson, and two assignments in space science management at NASA Headquarters in Washington DC.

David Morrison has held a variety of senior science management positions at NASA Headquarters in Washington and at Ames Research Center in California. In Washington he was the first Program Scientist for the Galileo mission to Jupiter, where he was responsible for defining the mission objectives and recommending the instruments and science investigations that were selected for this mission. He also served as Deputy Associate Administrator for what is now called the NASA Science Mission Directorate. At NASA Ames, he has been Chief of the Space Science Division, Director Space, and most recently the founding Director of the NASA Lunar Science Institute. His responsibilities included the major NASA missions Lunar Pathfinder, Kepler and SOFIA.

Professional activities 
Morrison is author of leading college undergraduate texts in astronomy and planetary science. He is a popular public writer and lecturer, promoting a scientific and fact-based perspective about such topics as Emmanuel Velikovsky’s pseudocosmology,  the evolution-creationist conflict, climate change denialism, and the 2012 doomsday hoax. 

As a science communicator, he frequently debunks myths of mystery planets. In interviews in 2011 and 2017, Morrison explained that he receives five emails a day about a supposed Nibiru cataclysm, an apocalyptic hoax, which he initially expected to be a short-lived phenomenon but which "keeps popping up" and is the subject of an estimated two million websites. He launched a YouTube video about the 2012 hoax telling the public that they have nothing to worry about. The video was briefly featured in the opening credits of the 2013 film World War Z, based on the 2006 novel of the same name.

Honors 
Morrison is a Fellow of the American Association for the Advancement of Science, of the California Academy of Sciences, and of the Committee for Skeptical Inquiry; also a supporter (and member of the Advisory Council, since 2013) of the National Center for Science Education. He is also a Scientist Trustee of the California Academy of Science.

He has served as Councilor of the American Astronomical Society, Chair of the Division for Planetary Science of the American Astronomical Society, President of the Astronomical Society of the Pacific, Chair of the Astronomy Section of the American Association for the Advancement of Science, and both President of Commission 16 (Planets and Satellites) and of the Working Group on Near Earth Objects of the International Astronomical Union.

Morrison received the Dryden Medal for research of the American Institute of Aeronautics and Astronautics, the Carl Sagan Medal of the American Astronomical Society for public Communication, and the Klumpke-Roberts Award of the Astronomical Society of the Pacific for his contributions to science education. NASA has also awarded him Outstanding Leadership medals twice as well as the Presidential Meritorious Rank.

In 2015, David Morrison received the American Astronomical Society's (AAS) Education Prize in recognition for his outstanding contributions to the education of the public, students and future astronomers.

Personal 

Morrison is married to Janet Lee Morrison, retired medical information specialist, and lives near San Jose, CA. Morrison has visited and photographed in some 60 countries on all the continents, ranging from the Arctic to the Antarctic, all across North America, Europe, and North Africa, and extensively in South and South-East Asia.

References

External links
 Ask an Astrobiologist (Questions and Answers)
  (March 2012)
 Morrison's outreach video debunking 2012 doomsday claims (2010 vimeo)
 author page at Skeptical Inquirer, example article Disinformation about Global Warming Volume 34.2, March/April 2010, on climate change denial.
 David Morrison (03.27.07)
 David Morrison (Director, Carl Sagan Center @ SETI)
 Debunker of Doomsday: NASA scientist tries to talk some sense into the world (Mercury News 12/17/2012)
 , part of the Silicon Valley Astronomy Lectures
 Free open-source astronomy textbook co-authored by David Morrison

Living people
American astronomers
American astrophysicists
Astrobiologists
1940 births
Harvard Graduate School of Arts and Sciences alumni
Planetary scientists
University of Illinois College of Liberal Arts and Sciences alumni